The Deutschland incident of 1937 occurred in May of that year, during the Spanish Civil War.

On 29 May 1937, a pair of Tupolev SB Soviet bombers attached to the Spanish Republican Air Force raided Nationalist air bases and the port of Ibiza, in the Mediterranean Sea. The aircraft departed from the airbase of Los Alcázares, near Cartagena. The German heavy cruiser Deutschland, which was part of the International Non-Intervention Committee patrol, was anchored off Ibiza and was allegedly misidentified by the bombers' crew as the Nationalist heavy cruiser Canarias. Two Soviet pilots, Captain Anton Progrorin and Lieutenant Vassily Schmidt, dropped their bombs on Deutschland, causing large fires on the ship and killing 31 sailors and wounding 74.

The following day German naval forces shelled the Republican held city of Almería in retaliation for the Republican air attacks on Deutschland. Because of the Deutschland incident, Germany and Italy left the meetings of the Non-Intervention Committee. The heavy cruiser Admiral Scheer shelled the port and the city of Almería with 200 rounds, resulting in 19 deaths, 55 wounded, and the destruction of 35 buildings. German and Italian warships were concentrated in the Mediterranean Sea next to Spain, and were starting to take a more active role in the supporting of Nationalist forces.

References

External links
Account, plus list of KM casualties

Maritime incidents in 1937
Military operations involving Germany
Soviet Union–Spain relations
Germany–Soviet Union relations
International maritime incidents
1937 in Spain
Mediterranean naval operations of the Spanish Civil War
May 1937 events